George Christensen (born 1978) is a former Australian federal politician.

George Christensen may also refer to:

 George Christensen (American football) (1909–1968), American football player and businessman

See also
 George Christian (disambiguation)